The Lagos International also known as Lagos International Badminton Classics is an annual open international badminton tournament held in Lagos, Nigeria. This tournament established since 2014, organized by the Lagos State Badminton Association (LSBA) and Badminton Federation of Nigeria. The tournament sanctioned by the Badminton World Federation (BWF) and Badminton Confederation of Africa (BCA), and has grade as BWF International Challenge level with the total prize money $15,000. The classics is expected to help Nigerian players to improve their world ranking as well as play against some of the top rated players in the world, and it is also an opportunity to showcase the positive side of Lagos and Nigeria. It is also an intervention programme of the Lagos State Government, it is a series of international open sporting events geared towards attracting the best continental and global sports talents to the shores of the region. The Lagos State Government believes that the tournament is part of series of international sports events that will bring world stars to the state.

Tournament 
The first tournament was held at Mobolaji Johnson Sports Centre, Rowe Park, in Yaba, Lagos, and categorized as BWF International Challenge with the total prize money $15.000. A total 162 athletes from 15 countries drawn at the competition. The winners of the first edition were Misha Zilberman of Israel and Jeanine Cicognini of Italy in the men's and women's singles; Andries Malan and Willem Viljoen of South Africa in the men's doubles; then the host country pairs won the women's and mixed doubles, represented by Dorcas Ajoke Adesokan/Maria Braimoh, and Enejoh Abah/Tosin Damilola Atolagbe.

The second edition was held from 15 to 18 July 2015, attracted at least 28 countries, and the host country represented by 80 players. The Vice-President of Nigeria Badminton Federation who also doubles as Chairman LSBA, Francis Orbih, said that this tournament is an initiative borne out of the need to create an international competition for home grown talents who don’t participate in  international tournaments. Lagos State Governor, Akinwunmi Ambode, gave the commitment at the finals and closing ceremony will continue to sponsor this tournament. At the end of the tournament, India clinched three title in the men's singles, men's and women's doubles, Czech Republic won the women's singles, and Poland in the mixed doubles.

In 2016, This tournament failed to hold due to the economic recession facing the country. The third edition then held between 25 and 29 July 2017, at the Molada Okoya Hall of the Teslim Balogun Stadium, Surulere. The prize money has increased to $20,000, and attracted 75 men's and 36 women's athletes.

Previous winners

Performances by nation

References

External links
 Lagos State Badminton Association

Badminton tournaments
International sports competitions in Lagos
Badminton tournaments in Nigeria
Recurring sporting events established in 2014
2014 establishments in Nigeria